Hazara Pioneers may refer to:

4th Hazara Pioneers
106th Hazara Pioneers
108th Hazara Pioneers